Laser isotope separation, or laser enrichment, is a technology of isotope separation using selective ionization of atoms or molecules by the means of precisely tuned lasers.

The techniques are:
 Atomic vapor laser isotope separation (AVLIS), applied to atoms
 Molecular laser isotope separation (MLIS), applied to molecules
 Separation of isotopes by laser excitation (SILEX), a classified process involving uranium hexafluoride and a carrier gas.